Giovanni II may refer to:

 Giovanni II Participazio (9th century)
 Giovanni II Valente (????–1360), third doge of the Republic of Genoa
 Giovanni II Bentivoglio (1443–1508), tyrant of Bologna
 Giovanni II Ventimiglia, 6th Marquis of Geraci (16th century)
 Giovanni II Cornaro (1647–1722), Venetian nobleman and statesman